Football is one of the two most popular sports in Afghanistan; the other one being cricket.

Early history

According to the Afghanistan Football Federation, the first Afghan football club was Mahmoudiyeh F.C., which was founded in 1934. Their men's team traveled to India three years later and took part in 18 games of which 8 were won, 9 lost and 1 tied. Ariana Kabul F.C. was established in 1941 and became the second Afghan football club. This team sent a men's team to Tehran upon invitation from Iran, played 3 games in which 1 was won and 2 were lost. Nothing is known about the early history of women's football in the country.

In 1948, the Afghanistan Football Federation joined FIFA and sent a men's national team to the UK to compete in the 1948 Summer Olympics. They lost their only match in a preliminary round 0–6 to Luxembourg national football team. From 1974 to 1979, an international football tournament named "Afghanistan Republic Day Festival Cup", was organized in the country, in which multiple foreign teams participated.

A Afghanistan women's national football team is only recognized by the Federation since 2007.

Football governance
Football in Afghanistan is governed by the Afghanistan Football Federation (AFF). The AFF was founded in 1922 and is a member of FIFA since 1948. In 1954, AFF became one of the founding members of the Asian Football Confederation and in 2015 of the Central Asian Football Confederation.
Since the Fall of Kabul (2021), women's football is forbidden under the Taliban and AFF has subsequently discontinued all women's football programs. The Afghanistan women's national football team has taken refuge in Australia and keeps training and playing regularly, while a development squad is based in the UK. Both teams receive no financial or organisational support by AFF, AFC or FIFA and cannot compete in official tournaments, as they lack recognition by AFF.

League system
There is currently no women's league in Afghanistan. For the men's league system, see Afghanistan football league system.

Cup system
There is currently no women's or men's cup tournament in Afghanistan.

Men's national team

One of the major successes of the Afghanistan men's national team came when the team won the 2013 SAFF Championship in Nepal. They have also finished runner-up of the same event in 2011 and 2015 and fourth at the Asian Games 1951 and the 2014 AFC Challenge Cup.

Women's national team

One of the major successes of the Afghanistan women's national team came when the team reached the semi finals of the 2012 SAFF Women's Championship in Sri Lanka.

Afghanistan football clubs

References

External links
Afghanistan Football Federation